The 1953 All-Ireland Senior Camogie Championship Final was the 22nd All-Ireland Final and the deciding match of the 1953 All-Ireland Senior Camogie Championship, an inter-county camogie tournament for the top teams in Ireland.

A fifteen-year-old Úna O'Connor scored three goals as Dublin won easily.

References

All-Ireland Senior Camogie Championship Final
All-Ireland Senior Camogie Championship Final
All-Ireland Senior Camogie Championship Final, 1953
All-Ireland Senior Camogie Championship Finals
Dublin county camogie team matches
Tipperary county camogie team matches